Barefoot in the Park is an American sitcom that aired in 1970 on ABC. Based on Neil Simon's Broadway play of the same name, the series cast members are predominantly black, making it the first American television sitcom since Amos 'n' Andy to have a predominantly black cast (Vito Scotti is the sole major white character). Barefoot in the Park had been a 1967 film starring Robert Redford and Jane Fonda.

Synopsis
Scoey Mitchell plays Paul Bratter, a newlywed attorney for the law firm Kendricks, Keene & Klein living in lower Manhattan with his wife Corie (played by Tracy Reed). The show was a slice-of-life comedy about surviving in New York City. Other regulars included Thelma Carpenter as Corie's mother, Mable Bates, Harry Holcombe as Mr. Kendricks, Vito Scotti as Mr. Velasquez, and Nipsey Russell as local pool hall owner, Honey Robinson.

Guest stars
Dead End Kids alumnus Huntz Hall and actor Jackie Coogan appeared on the 10th episode, aired December 3, 1970, titled Disorder in the Court (which gets its title from the 1936 Three Stooges short). Penny Marshall made one of her early television appearances on the fourth episode of the series, aired October 5, 1970, titled "In Sickness and in Health". Marshall's later co-star of the mid-1970s television success Laverne & Shirley, Cindy Williams, appeared on the sixth episode, which aired on October 29, 1970, titled "The Marriage Proposal".

Cancellation
When Barefoot in The Park premiered on Thursday, September 24, 1970, at 9 p.m., it was the lead-in program for another series based on a Neil Simon play, The Odd Couple, which debuted immediately afterward. Because both comedies followed ABC’s popular series Bewitched, which aired the same evening at 8:30 p.m., it was hoped that the long-running sitcom would provide a strong ratings segue for both series.  However, Bewitched was in its seventh season and experiencing a ratings slump. As a result, viewership for both Barefoot in the Park and The Odd Couple was disappointing.

In the case of Barefoot in the Park, there was also behind-the-scenes strife. Star Scoey Mitchell was fired due to "differences of opinion" with the series' producers. By this time, only 12 episodes of the sitcom had been produced. Rather than replace Mitchell with another actor and disenchanted with the low ratings, ABC decided to cancel Barefoot in the Park in December, 1970. In January 1971, the network moved The Odd Couple to Friday nights where its ratings improved. Despite the fact that it never placed in the top 30 television shows, The Odd Couple had a five-year run on ABC and won Emmy Awards for its two stars Tony Randall and Jack Klugman. The installments of Barefoot in the Park were rerun as episodes of Love, American Style in syndication.

Production notes
The show was produced by William P. D'Angelo, and various episodes were written or directed by much of the same team that had developed The Odd Couple (Jerry Paris, Harvey Miller, Bruce Bilson and Garry Marshall). Director Charles Rondeau also had directed almost the entire first half of the first season of the American sitcom F-Troop, which also aired on ABC.

Episode list

References

External links

1970 American television series debuts
1970 American television series endings
1970s American sitcoms
1970s American black sitcoms
American Broadcasting Company original programming
English-language television shows
Television series based on plays
Television series by CBS Studios
Television shows set in New York City
Television series based on works by Neil Simon